The Raiffeisen Grand Prix was a cycling race held annually in Austria between 1996 and 2019. It was held as part of the UCI Europe Tour as a category 1.2 race.

Winners

References

External links

Cycle races in Austria
Recurring sporting events established in 1996
1996 establishments in Austria
UCI Europe Tour races
Sport in Styria